Polistes badius is a species from the subgenus Polistes. The species was originally described by Carl Eduard Adolph Gerstaecker in 1873.

References

Taxa named by Carl Eduard Adolph Gerstaecker
badius